Zhang Jingsheng may refer to:

 Zhang Jingsheng (singer-songwriter), Chinese songwriter and political prisoner
 Zhang Jingsheng (sexologist), Chinese sexologist (1888–1970)